Glenda R. Carpio is Professor of African and African American Studies and English at Harvard University. Her book, Laughing Fit to Kill: Black Humor in the Fictions of Slavery was published by Oxford University Press in 2008. She is currently working on a book on immigration, expatriation, and exile in American literature. Carpio has been named one of the ROOT.com 100 for 2010.

Education 
Carpio received her Ph.D. in English from the University of California, Berkeley, and her B.A. was earned at Vassar College. She was awarded tenure at Harvard University in both the English and African and African American Studies departments.

Career 
Carpio started her teaching career in Compton, California where she taught 8th grade English and 4th grade through the Teach for America program. She taught at University of California at Berkeley, Pace University, and New York University prior to coming to Harvard University. She recently received Harvard University's Abramson Award for Excellence and Sensitivity in Undergraduate Teaching.

Books
Carpio, Glenda. Laughing Fit to Kill: Black Humor in the Fictions of Slavery. New York, NY: Oxford University Press, 2008.  According to WorldCat, the book is held in 1296  libraries
Review: Goddu, T.A. 2010. "Laughing Fit to Kill: Black Humor in the Fictions of Slavery by Glenda R. Carpio". American Literature. 82, no. 2: 421-42
ZYGMONSKI, AIMEE. 2009. "Book Review: Laughing Fit To Kill: Black Humor In The Fictions Of Slavery". Theatre Journal. 61, no. 3: 498-499.
Carpio, G. (2019).  (ed) The Cambridge companion to Richard Wright. 	Cambridge; New York : Cambridge University Press, 2019. 
Carpio, Glenda R., Werner Sollors, and Zora Neale Hurston. African American Literary Studies: New Texts, New Approaches, New Challenges. Heidelberg: Universitätsverlag   2010. 	 
Review: Fishkin, S.F. 2011. "Glenda R. Carpio and Werner Sollors, Eds., African American Literary Studies: New Texts, New Approaches, New Challenges". African American Review. 44, no. 1/2: 280-282.
Review:"Book Review: Glenda R. Carpio and Werner Sollors (eds.), African American Literary Studies: New Texts, New Approaches, New Challenges ''Journal of American Studies. 46.2 (2012).

Personal life 
At 12, Carpio came to America as a Guatemalan immigrant without knowing a word of English. She splits her time between Harvard and Venice, where her husband lives.

References 

{{| 9781108475174}}

Harvard University faculty
Year of birth missing (living people)
Living people
Teach For America alumni